Frédérique Lambert  (born March 27, 1992) is a Canadian racquetball player. Lambert is the current Canadian Champion in Women's Singles and Women's Doubles, and has won seven Canadian Championships: four in Women's Singles and three in Women's Doubles. She has been a member of the Canadian National Team since 2008, and has won several medals in international competitions, most recently a bronze medal in Women's Doubles at the 2016 World Championships. Lambert was the #2 ranked player at the end of the 2017-18 Ladies Professional Racquetball Tour (LPRT) season.

International career 

Lambert's first international appearance was at the 2008 Pan Am Championships, where she was a bronze medalist in doubles with Josée Grand'Maître, losing in the semi-finals to Chileans Angela Grisar and Fabiola Marquez.

Since then, Lambert has played for Canada on nine other occasions. Her best results to date are silver medals at the 2016 and 2012 Pan American Championships. In 2016, she lost to Mexican Paola Longoria in the final, 15-3, 15-6. In 2012, Lambert defeated American Rhonda Rajsich in the semi-finals, 15-13, 15-10, but had to withdraw due to injury in the final against  Longoria.

Lambert was also a silver medalist at the 2010 Pan American Championships in doubles with Genevieve Brodeur, when they lost to Mexicans Samantha Salas and Susana Acosta in final, 15-11, 15-4. In 2016, Lambert played doubles at the Pan American Championships with Jennifer Saunders, and they were bronze medalists, losing in the semi-finals to Longoria and Salas, 15-5, 15-8.

Lambert earned two bronze medals at the 2012 World Championships. She was a bronze medalist in women's doubles with Josée Grand'Maître, and in the women's team event also.

Lambert was a bronze medalist at the 2009 Pan American Championships in singles, when she lost to Bolivian Carola Loma, 15-3, 15-14.

Lambert has played in two Pan American Games. In  the 2011 Pan Am games, she lost to Bolivian Maria Jose Vargas in the second round, 15-11, 15-8 of Women's Singles, and in 2015, she lost to Rhonda Rajsich in the quarterfinals. But in the 2015 Women's Team event, Lambert and   Jennifer Saunders earned bronze medals in the Women's Team event, losing to the USA in the semi-finals.

Lambert was the International Racquetball Federation World Junior Champion in Girl's U18 in 2011, when she defeated Vargas in the final, 4-15, 15-7, 11-4. She was also World Junior Champion in Girl's U14 in 2007.

Professional career 

Lambert had a career high ranking in the 2016-17 Ladies Professional Racquetball Tour (LPRT) season, as she reached #2 and finished there at the end of the season, which was her fourth consecutive top 10 finish. Lambert is the fifth Canadian to be in the top 10 of the women's pro tour after Christie Van Hees, Jennifer Saunders, Lori-Jane Powell, and Heather Stupp. Her 2nd-place ranking is the second highest ranking by a Canadian behind only Van Hees, who was #1 in 2004-05.

Lambert is also the second Canadian to win a women's professional event (Van Hees was first), as she won the Atlanta Championships in Lilburn, Georgia, in August 2016. In that tournament, Lambert defeated Alexandra Herrera in the final, 11-6, 11-3, 11-9, Jessica Parrilla in the semi-finals,  7-11, 11-3, 11-7, 11-5, and Cristina Amaya in the quarterfinals,  13-11, 9-11, 6-11, 11-2, 11-3.

Lambert's first LPRT final appearance was at the 2014 New Jersey Open, when she was runner-up to  Paola Longoria, who defeated Lambert in the final, 11-6, 11-4, 11-5. To reach the final, Lambert defeated Maria Jose Vargas in the semi-finals and Rhonda Rajsich in the quarterfinals.

Lambert's first semi-final was in September 2013 at the Abierto Mexicano de Racquetas tournament in Toluca, Mexico. Lambert upset 2nd seed Rajsich in the Round of 16, then defeated Maria Paz Muñoz in the quarter-finals before losing to Amaya in the semis in four games, 11-9, 6-11, 11-0, 11-5.

Canadian career 

Lambert won Women's Singles at the 2017 Canadian Championships in Brossard, Québec, where she defeated  Jennifer Saunders in the final, 15-7, 15-8. That was her second Canadian Championship in Women's Singles. Her first singles championship came in 2015, when she also defeated Saunders in the final, 15-7, 15-7.  Lambert has now won three Canadian Championships overall, as she won Women's Doubles in 2010 with Brandi Jacobson Prentice.

Lambert continues to be the #1 women's player in Canada, a position she obtained in January 2014 after defeating Saunders in two consecutive tournaments.

Previously, Lambert was runner-up to Saunders at the Canadian National Championships in singles in 2009, 2011 and 2012. She's also been runner-up in doubles: twice with Brandi Jacobson Prentice - in 2011 and 2012 - and in 2013 with Michele Morissette.

Personal life  

Lambert lives in Montreal, Quebec. She is a graduate of the Université de Montréal Faculty of Medicine.

See also 

 List of racquetball players

References

External links 

  Lambert's Ladies Professional Racquetball Tour page 
 Lambert's Canadian Olympic Association page

1992 births
Canadian racquetball players
Living people
Racquetball players at the 2011 Pan American Games
Sportspeople from Montreal
Racquetball players at the 2015 Pan American Games
Pan American Games bronze medalists for Canada
Pan American Games medalists in racquetball
Racquetball players at the 2019 Pan American Games
Université de Montréal alumni
Medalists at the 2015 Pan American Games